XHXC-FM is a radio station on 96.1 FM in Taxco, Guerrero. It is owned by Radio Cañón.

History
XEXC-AM received its concession in 1959. It was owned by Benito García Aceves and broadcast on 1270 kHz, though it quickly moved to 1480. In 1996, it was sold to Rosalinda Bustamante Sosa, who in turn sold XEXC in 2002 to Super Mil de Guerrero, S.A. de C.V. 
By the 2002 sale, XEXC had moved to 960 kHz; at this time it was carrying a grupera format known as La Más Perrona. In 2008, Super Mil sold it to ABC Radio.

In 2011, XEXC migrated to FM on 96.1 MHz.

References

Radio stations in Guerrero